Puerto Rico Highway 191 (PR-191) is a rural road located in eastern Puerto Rico and is the main access to the El Yunque National Forest.

Route description
PR-191 follows a north–south path through El Yunque National Forest and the Sierra de Luquillo and is divided into two non-contiguous sections.

Northern section
The highway begins at PR-955 in the community of Palmer in the municipality of Río Grande.  From there, it climbs into El Yunque National Forest 4 km from its beginning.  Inside the forest, the road is concurrent with Forest Highway 191 and many of the forest's major attractions are along the route.  At 7.8 km is the Las Cabezas Observation Point and at 8.1 km is La Coca Falls where an access gate prevent traffic on PR-191 beyond that point from 6:00 PM to 7:30 AM.  The route continues past the Yokahu Tower (8.8 km) and Baño Grande, Baño de Oro, and an information center (11.7-11.9 km).  The road is closed to public traffic through part of the forest starting at a point 13.1 km from the beginning in Palmer and immediately past PR-191's second junction with PR-9938 (which is signed "Ramal 938") and just before a junction with Forest Route 10 and near the Mount Britton and El Yunque Peak trailhead.

Southern section

The highway continues south out of El Yunque National Forest passing the village of Florida and ending again at PR-31, near Río Blanco in the municipality of Naguabo.

Major intersections

See also

 List of highways numbered 191
 Forest highway

References

External links

 El Yunque National Forest Brochure and Map. October 2007.

191
Forest Highways in the United States
El Yunque National Forest